The Naulahka is a 1918 American silent adventure film directed by George Fitzmaurice and starring Antonio Moreno, Helene Chadwick and Warner Oland. It was made for a reported cost of $100,000 leading the studio to claim it was the most expensive film ever made, although many earlier productions had in fact been made with larger budgets. It is based on a poem of the same name by Rudyard Kipling. Originally eight reels long, it was later shortened to six with a running time of around an hour.

The film's sets were designed by the art directors Anton Grot and William Cameron Menzies. It was shot at the Solax Studios at Fort Lee, the traditional center of the American film industry.

Cast
 Antonio Moreno as Nicholas Tarvin 
 Doraldina as Sitahbai 
 Helene Chadwick as Kate Sheriff 
 J.H. Gilmour as Mr. Mutrie 
 Warner Oland as Maharajah 
 Mary Alden as Prince's Mother 
 Edna Hunter as Mrs. Mutrie

References

Bibliography
 Ward, Richard Lewis. When the Cock Crows: A History of the Pathé Exchange. SIU Press, 2016.

External links
 

1918 films
1918 adventure films
1910s English-language films
American silent feature films
American adventure films
American black-and-white films
Films directed by George Fitzmaurice
Pathé Exchange films
Films shot in Fort Lee, New Jersey
Films based on works by Rudyard Kipling
Silent adventure films
1910s American films